In April and May 2007, following a previous attempt in 2005, the Oregon state legislature passed legislation to make virtually all of the rights afforded by the state to married couples available to same-sex couples.  The status is referred to in Oregon law as a domestic partnership, avoiding the use of the terms marriage or civil union. Governor Ted Kulongoski signed the bill on May 9, 2007. While January 1, 2008 was the date the statute would have taken effect, a court challenge had delayed its implementation. It was resolved on February 1, 2008, and the law went into effect that day, with registrations beginning on February 4, 2008.

History 

On July 8, 2005, Oregon state senators approved legislation to allow same-sex civil unions. As originally written, Oregon Senate Bill 1000 would create civil unions and prohibit discrimination based on sexual orientation in housing, employment, public accommodations and public services. The vote at the Oregon State Capitol in Salem was 19-10 in favor of the measure.

The Republican Speaker of the Oregon House of Representatives, Karen Minnis, announced that she would not let the bill be passed. On July 21, the House performed a series of moves where the bill was amended, removing most of its language and replacing it with different text (seen by some to be a "gut and stuff" maneuver). The new text of Senate Bill 1000 no longer contained language about sexual orientation, prohibition of discrimination, nor civil unions. Instead, it reaffirmed the recent state constitutional prohibition of same-sex marriage and proposed to create "reciprocal beneficiary agreements". "Reciprocal beneficiaries" could be any two people prohibited by law from marrying each other, such as a "widowed mother and her unmarried son", and would not have the rights and obligations of married persons, specifically excluding employer-granted benefits such as health insurance or retirement benefits. Reciprocal beneficiaries would be granted inheritance rights, and the power to make medical or financial decisions if the reciprocal beneficiary was incapacitated.

The changes effectively killed momentum to pass the bill, which died in committee.

However, after the November 2006 mid-term elections Democrats won a majority of the formerly Republican-controlled House, and in early 2007, Democrats re-introduced a bill in the House similar to the 2005 legislation. The bill adopted the term "domestic partnership" to describe these unions; the terms "marriage" or "civil union" were absent. This bill enjoyed a relatively easy passage through the legislature, when compared to its 2005 predecessor. Passed by the House on April 17, 2007 (by a vote of 34-26) and by the Senate on May 2, 2007 (by a vote of 21-9), Governor Kulongoski signed the Oregon Family Fairness Act on May 9, 2007. The law was scheduled to take effect January 1, 2008, but was delayed by a preliminary injunction until after a hearing on February 1, 2008, where the injunction was lifted. Domestic partnerships became effective from February 4, 2008.

Differences in the legislation 
Given the use of the term "domestic partnerships", the Oregon legislation is more in line with Washington state's recognition of same-sex relationships and California's recognition of same-sex relationships, as opposed to the civil union legislation created in Vermont, New Jersey, and New Hampshire. However, unlike the registries in California and Washington state, domestic partnerships in Oregon are not available to opposite-sex couples.

Oregon's legislation has no ceremony requirement. All marriage and civil union legislation require a ceremony, whether religious or civil, to be considered valid. In Oregon couples are required only to register their domestic partnerships through the submission of a paper form. Additionally, the Oregon statute states that "the legal recognition of domestic partnerships under the laws of this state may not be effective beyond the borders of this state and cannot impact restrictions contained in federal law."

House Bill 2839 
House Bill 2839 was introduced during the 2009 legislative session to make some technical fixes to the state's exiting domestic partnership legislation, including in the areas of taxation and health insurance benefits and entitlements, taking a domestic partner's surname, and clarifying the term "domestic partnership" and "civil union" as used in other states, so that the state of Oregon would recognize them as "domestic partnerships". The Governor signed the bill into law on June 25, 2009.

Delays 
In 2007, an attempted referendum to repeal these laws before they take effect failed to gather enough signatures. Such an effort, accomplished by a petition putting the laws to voter approval via a ballot question, would have delayed enforcement of the law to January 1, 2009. In September 2007, groups challenging the amendment submitted approximately 63,000 signatures in favor of repealing the legislation; the minimum number of signatures required for a referendum is 55,179. The Secretary of State's office later determined that only 55,063 valid signatures were collected, thereby removing a barrier to a January 1, 2008 effective date. On December 28, federal judge Michael W. Mosman issued an injunction preventing implementation of the law, after hearing a legal challenge (by a group opposing the measure) criticizing the method used by the Secretary of State's office to determine what constitutes a valid signature. A hearing on this issue was then scheduled for February 1, 2008, when the injunction was lifted, allowing the law to go in force immediately, with registrations beginning on February 4, 2008.

Opposite-sex domestic partnerships 
In January 2023, a bill passed the Oregon House of Representatives to allow opposite-sex couples to formally enter into a domestic partnerships. The bill is yet awaiting a vote within the Oregon Senate.

See also 
 LGBT rights in Oregon
 Same-sex marriage in Oregon
 Same-sex marriage in the United States
 Same-sex marriage legislation in the United States
 Same-sex marriage in the United States public opinion
 Same-sex marriage status in the United States by state
 List of benefits of marriage in the United States
 Defense of Marriage Act
 Marriage Protection Act
 U.S. state constitutional amendments banning same-sex unions
 Federal Marriage Amendment
 Domestic partnerships in the United States
 Freedom to Marry Coalition
 History of civil marriage in the U.S.

References

External links 
 Oregon Domestic Partnership Forms, Oregon Center for Health Statistics page with domestic partnership forms and further information
 Basic Rights Oregon, a group committed to ending discrimination based on sexual orientation and gender identity in Oregon
 Concerned Oregonians, a group seeking to prevent Oregon House Bill 2007 (2007) and Oregon Senate Bill 2 (2007) from becoming law

Oregon law
Oregon
LGBT rights in Oregon